Kinnikinnick is a Native American and First Nations herbal smoking mixture, made from a traditional combination of leaves or barks. Recipes for the mixture vary, as do the uses, from social, to spiritual to medicinal.

Etymology
The term "kinnikinnick" derives from the Unami Delaware , "mixture" (c.f. Ojibwe giniginige "to mix something animate with something inanimate"), from Proto-Algonquian *kereken-, "mix (it) with something different by hand".

By extension, the name was also applied by the colonial European hunters, traders, and settlers to various shrubs of which the bark or leaves are used in the mixture, most often bearberry (Arctostaphylos spp.) and to lesser degree, red osier dogwood (Cornus sericea) and silky cornel (Cornus amomum), and even to Canadian bunchberry (Cornus canadensis), evergreen sumac (Rhus virens), littleleaf sumac (Rhus microphylla), smooth sumac (Rhus glabra), and staghorn sumac (Rhus typhina).

Indigenous names
 Algonquin: nasemà, "tobacco" (mitàkozigan, "unmixed tobacco"; apàkozigan, "mixed tobacco")
 Dakota and Lakota: čhaŋšáša
 Menominee : ahpa͞esāwān, "kinnikinnick"
 Odaawaa: semaa, "tobacco" (mtaaḳzigan, "unmixed tobacco"; paaḳzigan, "mixed tobacco")
 Ojibwe: asemaa, "tobacco" (mitaakozigan, "unmixed tobacco"; apaakozigan, "mixed tobacco")
 Shoshoni: äñ′-ka-kwi-nûp, "kinnikinnick" 
 Winnebago: roxį́šučkéra, "bark to smoke"

Preparation and use
The preparation varies by locality and nation. Bartlett quotes Trumbull as saying: "I have smoked half a dozen varieties of kinnikinnick in the North-west — all genuine; and have scraped and prepared the red willow-bark, which is not much worse than Suffield oak-leaf."

Eastern tribes have traditionally used Nicotiana rustica for social smoking, while western tribes usually use a variety of kinnikinick for ceremonial use. Cutler cites Edward S. Rutsch's study of the Iroquois, listing ingredients used by other Native American tribes: leaves or bark of red osier dogwood, arrowroot, red sumac, laurel, ironwood, wahoo, huckleberry, Indian tobacco, cherry bark, and mullein, among other ingredients.

Historical references
Among the Ojibwe, Densmore records the following: The material smoked by the Chippewa in earliest times were said to be the dried leaves of the bearberry (Arctostaphylos uva-ursi (L.) Spreng.), and the dried, powdered root of a plant identified as Aster novae-angliae L. Two sorts of bark were smoked, one being known as "red willow" (Cornus stolonifera Michx.) and the other as "spotted willow" (Cornus rugosa Lam.). The inner bark is used, after being toasted over a fire and powdered. It is then stored in a cloth or leather bag, and may be used on its own or in combination with other herbs.

See also
 Ceremonial pipe
 Tobacco
 Jamestown weed
 Puke weed

References

Bibliography 
 Moerman, Daniel E. (1998) Native American Ethnobotany. Timber Press. .

External links
 Traditional Tobacco pamphlet by the Urban American Indian Tobacco Prevention & Education Network

Native American culture
Native American religion
Pipe smoking
Religion and politics
Tobacco smoking